The Western Paraná State University (Unioeste, in Portuguese) is a public university of the State of Paraná, Brazil.

Created in 1988 and recognized in 1994 by the Federal Government of Brazil, Unioeste has 55 undergraduate degree courses and about 24 graduate programs. Based in the city of Cascavel, it has also campuses in the following cities: Foz do Iguaçu, Francisco Beltrão, Marechal Cândido Rondon and Toledo, all cities located in Paraná State, Brazil.

References

External links
 Official Unioeste Website 

Educational institutions established in 1988
Universities and colleges in Paraná
Cascavel
Foz do Iguaçu
Francisco Beltrão
Parana
1988 establishments in Brazil